NBC 30 may refer to one of the following television stations in the United States:

Current
WGBC-DT2, a digital channel of WGBC in Meridian, Mississippi
WSVW-LD in Harrisonburg, Virginia
WVIT in Hartford / New Britain, Connecticut (O&O)

Former
WVUV-LP/KBAD-LD in Pago Pago, American Samoa (2005 to 2012)